Charlie Whitehead (September 12, 1942 – June 26, 2015) was a soul singer from Franklin, Virginia. Whitehead moved to New York City in 1968 and was subsequently signed to Musicor's R&B subsidiary, Dynamo Records, by Charlie Foxx. At Dynamo, Whitehead was paired with Jerry Williams, Jr., and the two wrote songs (often with Gary U.S. Bonds) for artists such as Dee Dee Warwick and Doris Duke, including Warwick's 1970 hit, "She Didn’t Know (She Kept on Talking)".

Releasing only one single on Dynamo, Whitehead followed Williams when he left for Canyon Records. In 1970, using the name Raw Spitt, Whitehead released a self-titled album, produced and mostly written by Williams. An additional song recorded for, but not included on the album, "Songs to Sing" was also released as a single on United Artists.

Whitehead released some material under his own name on Williams' Stone Dogg Records and in 1973, the album Charlie Whitehead and the Swamp Dogg Band on Williams' Fungus Records.

In 1975, he made the Billboard R&B chart with "Love Being Your Fool" on Island Records. He released one more album, 1977's Whitehead at Yellowstone before dropping from view.

A CD compiling Raw Spitt, Charlie Whitehead and the Swamp Dogg Band, and various non-album tracks—called Songs to Sing: The Charlie Whitehead Anthology—was released by Ace Records in 2006. On June 26, 2015, Charlie Whitehead died.

References

American soul singers
1942 births
Songwriters from Virginia
Possibly living people
People from Franklin, Virginia
Alive Naturalsound Records artists
2015 deaths
African-American male songwriters
20th-century African-American male singers